

Friedrich Hochbaum (7 August 1894 – 28 January 1955) was a German general during World War II. He was a recipient of the  Knight's Cross of the Iron Cross with Oak Leaves of Nazi Germany. Hochbaum surrendered to Soviet troops in May 1945 and died in captivity in January 1955.

Awards and decorations

 Iron Cross (1914) 2nd Class (10 October 1914) & 1st Class (5 August 1916)
 Clasp to the Iron Cross (1939) 2nd Class (3 July 1941) & 1st Class (21 August 1941)
 German Cross in Gold on 25 April 1942 as Oberst in Infanterie-Regiment 253
 Knight's Cross of the Iron Cross with Oak Leaves
 Knight's Cross on 22 August 1943 as Generalleutnant and commander of 34. Infanterie-Division
 Oak Leaves on 4 June 1944 as Generalleutnant and commander of 34. Infanterie-Division

References

Citations

Bibliography

 
 
 

1894 births
1955 deaths
Military personnel from Magdeburg
Generals of Infantry (Wehrmacht)
German Army personnel of World War I
Recipients of the clasp to the Iron Cross, 1st class
Recipients of the Gold German Cross
Recipients of the Knight's Cross of the Iron Cross with Oak Leaves
German people who died in Soviet detention
German prisoners of war in World War II held by the Soviet Union
People from the Province of Saxony
Reichswehr personnel
German Army generals of World War II